Crocketville is an unincorporated community in Hampton County, South Carolina, United States.

References

Unincorporated communities in Hampton County, South Carolina
Unincorporated communities in South Carolina